The Hilton House in Magdalena, New Mexico was built in about 1900.  It was listed on the National Register of Historic Places in 1982.

It was deemed significant "as one of the finest and most prominent houses in Magdalena."  It was owned for a period by the Hilton family that operated a hotel in Magdalena.

See also

August Holver Hilton House, also NRHP-listed in Socorro County
National Register of Historic Places listings in Socorro County, New Mexico

References

External links

Houses on the National Register of Historic Places in New Mexico
Houses in Socorro County, New Mexico
National Register of Historic Places in Socorro County, New Mexico